The Smiths Grove Presbyterian Church is a historic church at College and 2nd Streets in Smiths Grove, Kentucky. It was built around 1900 and was added to the National Register of Historic Places in 1979.

It is a brick building, with brick laid in American bond, with a side entry tower.  A rear addition in brick is compatible with the original.

References

Presbyterian churches in Kentucky
Churches on the National Register of Historic Places in Kentucky
Gothic Revival church buildings in Kentucky
Churches completed in 1900
19th-century Presbyterian church buildings in the United States
Churches in Warren County, Kentucky
National Register of Historic Places in Warren County, Kentucky
1900 establishments in Kentucky